Juicy is an album by jazz percussionist Willie Bobo recorded in 1967 and released on the Verve label.

Reception

The Allmusic review by Stewart Mason awarded the album 3½ stars stating "from the lubricious title and cover photo on down, there's a certain 'swingin' at Hef's pad' vibe to the proceedings that makes this album of particular interest to latter-day hipsters. Most of the song selection consists of soul-jazz covers of popular hits of the day... but the real standouts are the small handful of band originals, particularly the fiery groove of the title track".

Track listing
 "Knock on Wood" (Steve Cropper, Eddie Floyd) - 2:40
 "Mating Call" (Bert Keyes) - 3:03
 "Mercy, Mercy, Mercy" (Joe Zawinul) - 2:33
 "Felicidad" (Sonny Henry) - 3:17
 "La Descarga del Bobo" (Willie Bobo) - 5:38
 "Juicy" (Mike Stoller) - 3:26
 "Ain't Too Proud to Beg" (Norman Whitfield, Edward Holland, Jr.) - 2:42
 "Music to Watch Girls By" (Sid Ramin) - 2:18
 "Dreams" (Val Valentín) - 3:24
 "Dis-Advantages" (Mitch Leigh) - 2:01
 "Roots" (Sonny Henry) - 3:13
 "Shing-a-Ling Baby" (Val Valentín, Willie Bobo) - 3:04
 "Juicy" [alternate take] (Stoller) - 2:19 Bonus track on CD reissue 
 "Music to Watch Girls By" [alternate take] (Ramin) - 2:26 Bonus track on CD reissue 
 "Dis-Advantages" [alternate take] (Leigh) - 2:01 Bonus track on CD reissue 
 "Shing-a-Ling Baby" [alternate take] (Valentín, Bobo) - 3:36 Bonus track on CD reissue   
Recorded in New York City January 12 (tracks 6, 12, 13 & 16), January 31 (tracks 3, 4, 9 & 11), February 1 (tracks 1, 7, 8, 10, 14 & 15) and February 4 (tracks 2 & 5), 1967

Personnel
Willie Bobo - timbales
Melvin Lastie - cornet
Bobby Brown - alto saxophone, tenor saxophone
Clarence "Sonny" Henry - guitar
Unknown - bass
Unknown - percussion

References

Verve Records albums
Willie Bobo albums
Albums produced by Teddy Reig
1967 albums